Dr. Jean R. Anderson (born 1953) is an internationally recognized obstetrician and gynaecologist, most well known for being the founder and first director of Johns Hopkins HIV Women's Health Program (1991).

Dr. Jean Anderson was also the director of Division of Gynecologic Specialties, coordinator of Global Women's Health Fellowship, and a professor of Gynecology and Obstetrics. Her expertise included cervical cancer, gynecology, HIV/AIDS, pregnancy and childbirth, uterine fibroids, and women's reproductive health.

Dr. Anderson received her undergraduate degree in chemistry from David Lipscomb College. After helping bandage injured animals with her grandmother as a child, Anderson discovered her passion for medicine. She started out at Vanderbilt University School of Medicine, being one of only five women in her class. In 1987, she began working for Johns Hopkins Hospital, where she was asked if she'd like to work for their new clinic made to help women with HIV. Her decision to take the job helped establish the clinic as a vital resource for the care needed for women with HIV and AIDS, being one of the first hospitals to use peer counseling.

In her lifetime so far, Jean Anderson has written over 75 articles on women with HIV, as well as the book The Manual for the Clinical Care for Women With HIV. Her efforts have garnered her international recognition, as well as four teaching awards, a membership at the American College of Obstetricians and Gynecologists and the American Academy of HIV Medicine. Today, she continues to serve as a director at Johns Hopkins HIV Women's Health Program.

Honors 
 Salutatorian, David Lipscomb College, 1975
 CIBA Award for Community Service, Vanderbilt University School of Medicine, 1977
 J. Donald Woodruff Teaching Award, 1990
 APGO Excellence in Teaching Award, 1993
 Golden Apple Student Teaching Award, 1995
 Golden Apple Resident Teaching Award, 2002
 Alpha Omega Alpha Honor Medical Society, 2005
 Distinguished alumna - David Lipscomb University, 2010
 Excellence in Teaching and Mentorship Award, Housestaff, 2011
 Constance Wofsey Women's Health Investigator Award, AIDS Clinical Trials Group, 2013

Memberships 
 Alpha Omega Alpha honorary medical society, 2005
 American Academy of HIV Medicine, 2002
 American College of Obstetrics and Gynecologist, 1985 fellow
 Howard Kelly Society, 2004
 International AIDS Society, 2000
 Lonnie S. Burnett OBGYN Society, 1983

Books 
 Anderson J (ed): A Guide to the Clinical Care of Women with HIV Infection, Washington, DC, U.S. Government Printing Office, 2013

References

20th-century American women scientists
21st-century American women scientists
1953 births
Living people
American obstetricians
American gynecologists
Vanderbilt University alumni
People associated with HIV/AIDS